James Steele McRae (born 28 October 1943) is a British former rally driver. He was highly successful in the British Rally Championship, winning the title a record five times in 1981, 1982, 1984, 1987 and 1988 which as of 2020 still stands. In the European Rally Championship for drivers, he was runner-up in 1982, while his highest placing in the World Rally Championship was fifteenth in 1983. McRae runs a plumbing business in his home town of Lanark. He and his wife Margaret had three sons, Colin, Alister and Stuart. Both Colin and Alister McRae were World Rally Championship drivers, with Colin winning the world championship in 1995. McRae's brother-in-law Hugh "Shug" Steele is also a former rally driver.

Career
Jimmy began his motorsport career riding motorcycles and he competed in some motorcycle races. He started his rallying at the age of 31 driving his own Mk1 Cortina fitted with Lotus running gear followed by an Escort Mk1 twin cam. The following year he approached SMT and drove a Group 1 Vauxhall Magnum for them culminating in a works drive the following year in a DTV Gp 1 Magnum. In 1978 he was promoted to the full DTV team and drove a Group 4 Vauxhall Chevette HS then HSR in the British Rally Championship alongside a single cam Chevette in the Castrol Autosport Series, narrowly missing out on the title to Malcolm Wilson.

Throughout his career, McRae drove for a number of different teams, including Vauxhall, Opel & Ford reaching a pinnacle during his spell in the Rothmans Rally Team, driving an Opel Manta 400. During his time at Rothmans, his teammates were Ari Vatanen, Walter Röhrl and Henri Toivonen. He then progressed to the MG Metro 6R4.

Though mostly retired from motorsport now, McRae still occasionally competes on historic rallies and some Scottish Rally Championship events, with some occasional outings on the Wales Rally GB. In 2006 he won the Roger Albert Clark Rally in a Stobart Motorsport sponsored Mark 2 Ford Escort.

In September 2008, McRae was one of a number of ex-world and British champions to take part in the Colin McRae Forest Stages Rally in memory of his son, who died in 2007. He drove a Porsche 911 on the rally. The impressive entry list included ex-World Championship drivers Hannu Mikkola, Ari Vatanen, Björn Waldegård, Stig Blomqvist, Malcolm Wilson, Russell Brookes, Andrew Cowan and Louise Aitken-Walker.

McRae took part in the 2014 British Historic Championship in a Firenza Can Am finishing fourth. He also took part in the 2014 Wales Rally GB for the first time in ten years.

Racing record

Complete WRC results

Complete British Touring Car Championship results
(key) (Races in bold indicate pole position in class) (Races in italics indicate fastest lap in class)

‡ Endurance driver (ineligible for points).

References

External links
 Rallybase Data page

1943 births
Living people
Scottish rally drivers
Scottish Rally Championship
World Rally Championship drivers
British Touring Car Championship drivers
Sportspeople from Lanark
Toyota Gazoo Racing drivers